The 2015 IBSF World Under-21 Snooker Championship was an amateur snooker tournament that took place from 18 July to 26 July 2015 in Bucharest, Romania  It was the 27th edition of the IBSF World Under-21 Snooker Championship and also doubles as a qualification event for the World Snooker Tour.

The tournament was won by number 1 seed Boonyarit Keattikun who defeated Welshman Jamie Clarke 8–7 in the final. As a result, Keattikun was given a two-year card on the professional World Snooker Tour for the 2016/2017 and 2017/2018 seasons.

Results

Round 1
Best of 7 frames

References

2015 in snooker
Snooker amateur tournaments
Sports competitions in Bucharest
2015 in Romanian sport
International sports competitions hosted by Romania
July 2015 sports events in Romania